Kentucky Route 658 (KY 658) is a  state highway in central Taylor County, Kentucky, that runs from U.S. Route 68 (US 68) and Cherokee Drive in northeastern Campbellsville to KY 1799 south of Arista.

Major intersections

References

0658
0658